The Senate Banking Subcommittee on Economic Policy is one of five subcommittees within the Senate Committee on Banking, Housing, and Urban Affairs.

Jurisdiction
The Subcommittee on Economic Policy oversees economic growth, employment and price stability, federal monetary policy, including the policy functions of the Federal Reserve System; the Council of Economic Advisers; money and credit, including currency, coinage, and notes; control of prices of commodities, rents and services; economic stabilization and defense production;  the Defense Production Act; financial aid to commerce and industry; loan guarantees; flood insurance; and disaster assistance carried out by the Federal Emergency Management Agency within the Department of Homeland Security.

Members, 118th Congress

Historical subcommittee rosters

117th Congress

External links
U.S. Senate Committee on Banking, Housing, and Urban Affairs
Senate Banking Committee Subcommittee list and membership page
 

Banking Senate Economic Policy